HMS Derwent was launched in 1807 and later that year became one of the first ships sent by the British Royal Navy to suppress the slave trade.

Career
Commander William Goate commissioned Derwent in June 1807 for the Channel. Commander Frederick Parker replaced Goate in November. Commodore Edward Columbine, the governor of Sierra Leone, raised his pennant in Solebay. The warships were the first ships in the West Africa Squadron that the British government had established to interdict the Trans Atlantic Slave Trade.

When the vessels arrived at Gorée, Columbine and Major Charles William Maxwell, the commander of the British garrison there, decided to make an attack on Senegal to prevent French privateers from continuing to use it as a base. Major Maxwell and some 160 men of the Royal African Corps embarked on Agincourt. Then she, Solebay, Derwent, Tigress, and some other vessels sailed on 4 July and arrived off the bar across the river on 10 July.

As the expedition landed its troops across the surf, Captain Parker of Derwent, one of his midshipmen, and six seamen drowned. The troops, together with 120 seamen and 50 marines moved up the river. The French force of 160 regulars and 240 militia retreated and on 13 July Saint Louis surrendered. The French prisoners of war were repatriated to France under parole.

On 11 July Solebay grounded trying to come up the river. All her crew and most of her stores were saved. Captain Columbine appointed his First Lieutenant, Joseph Swabey Tetley, to the command of Derwent in Parker's place.

22 Aug 1809 Derwent arrived at Spithead on 22 August, carrying Solebays captain and crew. Four days later Derwent came into Portsmouth.

On 31 August Tetley received promotion to the rank of Commander and was confirmed in command of Derwent. Between January and October 1810 Derwent underwent fitting at Portsmouth. Commander George Sutton assumed command in May 1810.

On 30 July 1811 Derwent captured the French privateer Rafleur. Rafleur, of Granville, carried 20 men armed with small arms.

Freundshaft, Bull. master, arrived at Ramsgate on 18 November, having lost her fore mast. She had been detained by Derwent.

On 7 February 1813 Derwent captured the French privateer Edouard off The Lizard. She was pierced for 16 guns but only had eight mounted. She had a complement of 49 men and had left Saint-Malo the evening before and had not made any captures.

On 9 February Quebec, Adams, master, arrived at Portsmouth. She had been sailing from London to Gibraltar when the American privateer Paul Jones had captured her near Lisbon on 20 January after a three-hour fight.  captured her on 23 May off the coast of Ireland after a chase. During the chase Paul Jones had five men wounded out of a crew of 85 at the time. Derwent had recaptured Quebec and sent her back to England.

Horatio, Walker, master, arrived at Portsmouth a some days before 24 October. She had been sailing from Teneriffe to London when a French privateer lugger of 14 guns and 95 men had captured her off the Wight. Derwent had recaptured her off Barfleur and sent her back to England.

On 24 December Lloyd's List reported that Derwent had recaptured Racehorse, which the French privateer Diligent, of 14 guns and 120 men, had captured. Racehorse had been sailing from Newfoundland to Teignmouth when captured.

Derwent arrived at Plymouth on 20 December. She had left there on 25 November with a convoy for St Andero. On the 30th a transport, letter "N", lost her bowsprit and foremast and Derwent towed her for two days. However a storm came up and Derwent had to drop the tow and there were fears for the transport's safety. Derwent herself lost her bowsprit in the storm and had to throw some guns overboard, but arrived safely at St Andero with three transports.

In June 1814 Commander Thomas Williams replaced Sutton. Derwent was paid off in 1815.

Fate
The "Principal Officers and Commissioners of His Majesty's Navy" offered the "Derwent sloop, of 382 tons", "Lying at Chatham", for sale on 7 March 1817. Derwent was sold to Mr. Young at Chatham on 7 March 1817 for £850.

Notes

Citations

References
 
 
 
 

1807 ships
Cruizer-class brig-sloops
Naval ships of the United Kingdom